Hiwaga sa Balete Drive (literally "Mystery on Balete Drive") is a 1988 Filipino anthology horror film directed by Peque Gallaga and Lorenzo A. Reyes. The film is based on the haunting legends on Balete Drive.

Plot
The film is divided into two stories: Ang Babae sa Balete Drive and Ikatlong Mata.

Ang Babae sa Balete Drive
The couple Dennis (Jestoni Alarcon) and Sandy (Rita Avila) meet Margarita, who haunts a house along Balete Drive. Margarita plans to steal Dennis for her to continue her marriage to her late husband.

Ikatlong Mata
Jonathan (Ian Veneracion) meets an accident, resulting to have his third eye opened. He eventually becomes a witness to various crimes through his third eye, including the ones of his uncle Paul (Joel Torre).

Cast
Rene Mariano as Narrator

Ang Babae sa Balete Drive
 Jestoni Alarcon as Dennis
 Rita Avila as Sandy
 Isabel Quiait as Anghel
 Zsa Zsa Padilla as Margarita
Mary Walter as Old Margarita
 John Borromeo as Margarita Man #1
 Jeffrey Veloso as Margarita Man #2
 Raul Arellano as Margarita Man #3

Ikatlong Mata
 Charito Solis as Helga
 Joel Torre as Peter and Paul/Roadrunner
 Gina Alajar as Gilda
 Ian Veneracion as Jonathan
 Michael Locsin as Clinton
 Harlene Bautista as Georgie
 Joed Serrano as Melvin
 Romy Romulo as Investigator
 Turko Cervantes as Big Bird
 Sam Brillantes as Samson
 Pen Medina as Gary
 Mario Taguiwalo as Mr. Panopio
 Maya dela Cuesta as Ms. Mijares

References

External links

1988 films
Filipino-language films
Philippine horror films
Seiko Films films
Films directed by Peque Gallaga
Films directed by Lore Reyes